is a professional Japanese baseball player. He plays infielder for the Tokyo Yakult Swallows.

References 

1997 births
Living people
Baseball people from Saitama Prefecture
Japanese baseball players
Nippon Professional Baseball infielders
Hokkaido Nippon-Ham Fighters players
Tokyo Yakult Swallows players